Dines is a name. It can be a surname which is either English or Yiddish, or it can be a Danish given name.

Surname 
Dines is an English surname. Dines is also a Jewish Romanian surname, derived from a woman named Dina. In Yiddish, it means "Dina's children".

The surname may refer to:

 Alberto Dines (1932–2018), Brazilian journalist
 Allen Dines (1921–2020), American lawyer and politician
 Bill Dines (1916–1992), English cricketer
 Daniel Dines (1972-), Romanian businessman
 Dino Dines (1944–2004), English keyboardist
 Gail Dines, American sociologist
 John Somers Dines (1885–1980), English meteorologist
 Joseph Dines (1886–1918), English amateur football player
 Lloyd Dines (1885–1964), American-Canadian mathematician
 Rebecca Dines, Australian actress
 Sarah Dines, British politician
 William Henry Dines, English meteorologist

Given name 
 Dines Bjørner (born 1932), Danish computer scientist
 Dines Carlsen (1901–1966) was an American Expressionist painter of Danish descent.

Other 
Dines Green, housing estate on the west bank of the city of Worcester, England

References

Surnames
English-language surnames
Romanian-language surnames
Jewish surnames